The National Association of Racing ( Chiho Keiba Zenkoku Kyokai, or NAR) is the authority for horse races operated by local governments in Japan (Prefectures, cities/towns/villages or unions of them). NAR itself does not operate horse races.

In Japan, horse racing operated by local governments are called chiho keiba.

Racetracks 
Here is the list of racetracks holding races operated by local governments (as of July 2019). All are oval flat dirt tracks except Obihiro (ban'ei) and Morioka (dirt outside and turf inside). Only four are left-handed (counter-clockwise), the others are right-handed (clockwise).

Racetracks used to hold prefectural/municipal races 
The following courses now hold only Japan Racing Association (JRA) races.

 Sapporo Racecourse (Chuo-ku, Sapporo, Hokkaido) - Prefectural races until 2009
 Hakodate Racecourse (Hakodate, Hokkaido) - Prefectural races until 1997
 Chukyo Racecourse (Toyoake, Aichi) - Prefectural/municipal races until 2002
 Niigata Racecourse (Kita-ku, Niigata, Niigata) - Prefectural races until 2002

Defunct NAR Racetracks

 Nakatsu Racecourse: Ended racing on March 22, 2001.
 Sanjo Racecourse: Ended racing on August 16, 2001.
 Masuda Racecourse: Ended racing on August 16, 2002.
 Ashikaga Racecourse: Ended racing on March 3, 2003.
 Kaminoyama Racecourse: Ended racing on November 11, 2003.
 Takasaki Racecourse: Ended racing on December 31, 2004.
 Utsunomiya Racecourse: Ended racing on March 14, 2005.
 Iwamizawa Racecourse: Ended racing on October 2, 2006.
 Kitami Racecourse: Ended racing on November 27, 2006.
 Asahikawa Racecourse: Ended racing in October 16, 2008.
 Arao Racecourse: Ended racing on December 23, 2011.
 Fukuyama Racecourse: Ended racing on March 24, 2013.

See also
 Japan Racing Association (JRA)
 Japan Bloodhorse Breeders' Association (JBBA)

References

External links 

 Web Site
 netKeiba.com
 Kanto Area Horse Racing

Horse racing organizations in Japan